The Spain national under-21 football team is the national under-21 football team of Spain and is controlled by the Royal Spanish Football Federation. The team, nicknamed La Rojita (The Little Red [One]), competes in the biennial UEFA European Under-21 Championship.

Following the realignment of UEFA's youth competitions in 1976, the Spain under-21 team was formed. Spain has a strong record (competition winners five times and runners-up twice); having consecutively won the 2011 and 2013 Championships. They hold the joint record with Italy for the most wins of the competition.

Since the under-21 competition rules insist that players must be 21 or under at the start of a two-year competition, technically it is an U-23 competition. For this reason, Spain's brief record in the preceding U-23 competitions is also shown, though in actuality, Spain played only three competitive U-23 matches. The first was in the "under-23 Challenge", which they lost, while the next two were in a two-team qualification "group" for the 1972 competition (facing the Soviet Union team, they lost 2–1 at home then drew 1–1 away and failed to qualify. Spain did not enter a team in the other two U-23 competitions, but have been ever present in under-21 competitions).

Spain's youth development programs has been challenging the South American dominance in the FIFA U-17 World Championship and the FIFA U-20 World Cup. In fact, 20 of the Spanish 23-man squad that won the Euro 2008 came through the ranks of the youth teams; most of them had won titles at the youth level as well.

Competitive record

UEFA European Under-21 Championship Record

*Denotes draws including knockout matches decided on penalty kicks.
Gold background color indicates first-place finish. Silver background color indicates second-place finish. Bronze background color indicates third-place finish.
Red border color indicates tournament was held on home soil.

Individual awards
Spanish players have won individual awards at UEFA European Under-21 Football Championship.

Player records

Top appearances

Note:  represents all the clubs that players played in at the time they did it too in the Under-21s.

Top goalscorers

Note:  represents all the clubs that players played in at the time they did it too in the Under-21s.

 Caps and goals correct as of 3 September 2020.

Recent results

Forthcoming fixtures

2023 UEFA European Under-21 Championship

Group phase

Players

Current squad
 The following players were called up for the friendly match.
 Match dates: 18 November 2022
 Opposition: 
 Caps and goals correct as of:''' 18 November 2022, after the match against .

Recent call-ups
The following players have been called up within the last twelve months are still eligible for selection.

 INJ

 INJ

Former squads
2021 UEFA European Under-21 Championship squads – Spain
2019 UEFA European Under-21 Championship squads – Spain
2017 UEFA European Under-21 Championship squads – Spain
2013 UEFA European Under-21 Championship squads – Spain
2011 UEFA European Under-21 Championship squads – Spain
2009 UEFA European Under-21 Championship squads – Spain
2000 UEFA European Under-21 Championship squads – Spain
1998 UEFA European Under-21 Championship squads – Spain
1996 UEFA European Under-21 Championship squads – Spain
1994 UEFA European Under-21 Championship squads – Spain

See also
Spain national football team
Spain national under-23 football team
Spain national under-20 football team
Spain national under-19 football team
Spain national under-18 football team
Spain national under-17 football team
Spain national under-16 football team
Spain national under-15 football team
Spain national youth football team

Notes

References

External links

 by RFEF
Tournament archive at UEFA
Europe – U-23/U-21 Tournaments at RSSSF

 
European national under-21 association football teams